Underground Classics is a compilation album by American hip hop musician, Pete Rock. The album gathers hard-to-find recordings from 12-inch singles and unreleased albums. All tracks are produced by Pete Rock, while vocals are handled by various guests. In a 2006 interview, Pete Rock stated that BBE Records released the compilation without his permission.

Track listing
All tracks produced by Pete Rock

Credits
 Compiled by Amir Abdullah

External links 
 Rapster Records official site

Pete Rock albums
Albums produced by Pete Rock
2006 compilation albums
Barely Breaking Even albums